Ronald Allen Weissenhofer (born February 3, 1964) is a former professional American football linebacker in the National Football League. He attended the University of Notre Dame. He would play in one game for the New Orleans Saints in 1987. Ron also was a coach at NCHS.

External links
Pro-Football reference

1964 births
Living people
Players of American football from Chicago
American football linebackers
Notre Dame Fighting Irish football players
New Orleans Saints players